Heeney is a surname. Notable people with the surname include:

Arnold Heeney, PC CC (1902–1970), Canadian lawyer, diplomat and civil servant
Cornelius Heeney (1754–1848), Irish-American merchant and politician
Darcy Heeney (1916–1941), New Zealand boxer
Dennis Heeney, Manitoba politician
Isaac Heeney (born 1996), Australian footballer
Michael P. Heeney, American country music songwriter
Patrick Heeney (1881–1911), Irish composer who wrote the music to the Irish national anthem
Tom Heeney (1898–1984), professional heavyweight boxer from New Zealand

See also
Heeney, Colorado, census-designated place in northern Summit County, Colorado, United States
The Merchant-Heeney Report, written for the Canadian government
Heney